This list covers optical lens designs grouped by tasks or overall type. The field of optical lens designing has many variables including the function the lens or group of lenses have to perform, the limits of optical glass because of the index of refraction and dispersion properties, and design constraints including realistic lens element center and edge thicknesses, minimum and maximum air-spaces between lenses, maximum constraints on entrance and exit angles, and even cost. Some lenses listed are overall types with sub-designs (as noted).

Simple lens designs
Simple lenses are lenses consisting of a single element. Lenses in this section may overlap with lens designs in other sections, for example the Wollaston landscape lens is a single element and also a camera lens design.

Basic types
 Biconcave lens
 Biconvex lens
 Convex-concave lens
 Plano concave lens
 Plano convex lens
 Meniscus lens
Designs
 Wollaston landscape lens

Achromatic lens designs
There are many compound designs of achromatic lenses, designed to reduce color-related distortion (Chromatic aberration):

 Achromatic doublet (type)
 Littrow doublet
 Fraunhofer doublet
 Clark doublet
 Oil-spaced doublet
 Steinheil doublet
 Apochromatic doublet
 Dialyte lens
 Superachromat

Camera lens designs
Camera lenses use a wide variety of designs because of the need to balance and trade off different requirements: angle of view (i.e. focal length in relation to the film or sensor size), maximum aperture,  resolution,  distortion,  color correction, back focal distance, and cost.

 Celor lens
 Chevalier lens
 Cooke Triplet
 Double-Gauss lens
 Frazier lens
 Fresnel lens
 Gauss lens
 Inverted telephoto (retrofocus) lens
 Petzval lens
 Plasmat lens
 Telephoto lens
 Tessar lens
 Wollaston landscape lens

Eyepiece designs
An eyepiece, a type of (usually a compound) lens that attaches to optical devices such as telescopes and microscopes, comes in many designs:

 Convex
 Galilean
 Huygens
 Ramsden
 Kellner or "Achromat"
 Plössl or "Symmetrical"
 Orthoscopic or "Abbe"
 Monocentric
 Erfle
 König
 RKE
 Nagler
 

Lens designs
 List